The Catedral Basílica Metropolitana  de San Juan Bautista, or in English, Metropolitan Cathedral Basilica of Saint John the Baptist, is the Roman Catholic cathedral of the Archdiocese of San Juan de Puerto Rico. The cathedral is one of the oldest buildings in San Juan, located in  Old San Juan, the oldest cathedral in the United States, and is the second oldest cathedral in the Americas. Even though the Cathedral of Santa María la Menor in Santo Domingo in the Dominican Republic, is an older church building, the Cathedral of San Juan Bautista was the first cathedral church in the Americas as San Juan, then known as the city of Puerto Rico, was the first diocese of the New World with bishop Don Alonso Manso in 1511. The site is the location of the first church built in the New World.
A private Puerto Rican foundation known as Fundación Protectora de la Catedral Metropolitana de San Juan, Inc. has been established to fund the historical restoration of the building and its art treasures for its 500th anniversary in 2021, and to protect it for coming centuries.

History
The original cathedral in what was the city of Puerto Rico (changed to San Juan Bautista in 1521) was constructed from wood in 1521. It was destroyed by a hurricane and the current structure constructed in 1540, being reshaped in later centuries, the last time being in 1917.

The first school in Puerto Rico was the Escuela de gramática (Grammar School). The school was established by Bishop Alonso Manso in 1513, in the area where the cathedral would later be constructed. The school was free of charge and the courses taught were Latin language, literature, history, science, art, philosophy and theology.

The cathedral contains the tomb of the Spanish explorer and settlement founder Juan Ponce de León. It also has a shrine to the Blessed Carlos Manuel Rodríguez Santiago, the first Puerto Rican and first Caribbean-born layperson in history to be beatified.

The first organist of the Cathedral of San Juan was the Canarian Domingo Crisanto Delgado Gómez who came from the island of Tenerife and managed to take this position in 1836, having been a composer in Cathedral Our Lady of Los Remedios of San Cristóbal de La Laguna in his native island.

Gallery

See also

 List of Catholic cathedrals in the United States
 List of cathedrals in the United States
List of the oldest buildings in Puerto Rico

References

External links

 Official Site
 Roman Catholic Archdiocese of San Juan Official Site 
 GCatholic page for Catedral Metropolitana Basílica de San Juan Bautista
 English language web site with information about the Cathedral of San Juan Bautista

Roman Catholic churches completed in 1521
16th-century Roman Catholic church buildings
Basilica churches in Puerto Rico
San Juan Bautista
Old San Juan, Puerto Rico
Tourist attractions in San Juan, Puerto Rico
Spanish Colonial architecture in Puerto Rico
Roman Catholic churches in San Juan, Puerto Rico
1521 establishments in the Spanish Empire